Coon Creek is a stream in the U.S. state of Minnesota. It is a tributary of the Redwood River.

Coon Creek was named from the fact it heads at Dead Coon Lake.

See also
List of rivers of Minnesota

References

Rivers of Lincoln County, Minnesota
Rivers of Lyon County, Minnesota
Rivers of Minnesota